Micrurus mipartitus (red-tailed coral snake or many-banded coral snake) is a species of coral snake in the family Elapidae. It is found in South and Central America. The redtail coral snake is common in agricultural areas in Colombia. Its highly neurotoxic venom is known to cause seizures in its prey by activating nerve proteins responsible for seizures within it.

Subspecies 
Five subspecies are currently recognized:

Phenotypic features
Micrurus mipartitus has a cylindrical body that can reach up to 140.6 centimeters in length. They have quite small eyes upon their round heads. The black bodily rings of this species can range anywhere from 34 to 84 and are sundered by yellow or white intermediaries. The second ring on the head and 3 or 4 of the tail rings exude a red color in contrast to the white or yellow bands.

Natural history 
Micrurus mipartitus is a species of crepuscular and nocturnal habits. During period of low rainfall, could be located underground several centimeters deep. In times of high rainfall, it is found on soil surface or where leaf litter is abundant. This coral snake lives from tropical dry forest to foggy forests and is related to human settlements in rural areas used for agriculture.

The diet of M. mipartitus is mainly based on snakes (e.g., Atractus werneri, A. sanctamartae, Leptotyphlops spp.) as well as lizards (e.g., Lepidoblepharis sanctaemartae), amphisbaenids (e.g., Amphisbaena spp.), frogs, and caecilians (e.g., Caecilia guntheri). It is oviparous; about eight white-colored eggs have been recorded, which are 2.9 cm long, with an average weight of 3.1 gr. Incubation period lasts between 73–87 days, total length of the infants could vary from 20–21.9 cm and weight is around 3.3 gr.

Range 
It occurs in Central America and South America. Limits of its range vary by source and may include Nicaragua and Costa Rica in the north, although older records from Nicaragua and Costa Rica likely refer to M. multifasciatus. The IUCN Redlist restricts its range to Panama, Colombia, Venezuela, and Ecuador, and possibly Peru. It has also been listed from Brazil (Rondônia).

Venom 
The redtail coral snake has a potentially deadly neurotoxic venom, which produces a complete depolarizing muscle block. Proteomics analysis of the venom components found that it contains about 60% three-finger toxins, 30% phospholipase A2, and 10% other toxins. The most abundant venom component is the three-finger toxin mipartoxin-I.

The venom acts by blocking the neuromuscular transmission of nerve muscle preparations, it acts in a post-synaptic way through the Nicotinic acetylcholine receptor (nAChr), inhibiting the muscle contractions in phrenic nerve diaphragm.  After the bite, local pain and paraesthesia appear in minutes, in severe cases, neurological manifestations appear in 30 minutes to 1–2 hours, such as progressive bilateral ptosis, dysarthria, progressive weakness in the muscles of the extremities, difficulties in walking, salivation, drowsiness, respiratory arrest, flaccid quadriparesis and severe flaccid quadriplegia. The LD50 for 18-20 gram mice is 9 μg and 0.45 mg / kg. The intraperitoneal lethal dose is 0.125 mg / kg and 0.06 μg / g.

References 

mipartitus
Snakes of Central America
Snakes of South America
Reptiles of Colombia
Reptiles of Costa Rica
Reptiles of Panama
Reptiles of Ecuador
Reptiles of Venezuela
Reptiles described in 1854
Taxa named by Gabriel Bibron
Taxa named by André Marie Constant Duméril
Taxa named by Auguste Duméril